Meng Ziyi  (born 5 December 1995) is a Chinese actress. She is known for her roles as Mu Nianci in  The Legend of the Condor Heroes (2017), Ye Hongyu in Ever Night (2018) and Wen Qing in The Untamed (2019).

Career
In 2016, Meng made her acting debut in the historical fiction television series God of War, Zhao Yun, and gained attention for her role as the female lead's attendant and close friend. In 2017, Meng became known after starring in the wuxia drama The Legend of the Condor Heroes as Mu Nianci.

In 2018, Meng played lead roles in the romance web dramas Double Life and Starlight. She then starred in romance melodrama All Out of Love, playing the role of an antagonist. The same year, she starred in the fantasy historical drama Ever Night, gaining attention for her performance as a strong and independent swordswoman.

In 2019, Meng starred in the xianxia drama The Untamed, based on the novel Mo Dao Zu Shi.

In 2020, Meng starred in the youth business drama Rebirth of Shopping Addict. The same year, she was cast in the wuxia drama Sword Snow Stride written by Wang Juan.

Filmography

Film

Television series

Television show

References

1995 births
Living people
Actresses from Changchun
Beijing Film Academy alumni
21st-century Chinese actresses
Chinese television actresses